Laeca Burn is a stream in northeastern Aberdeenshire, Scotland. There are numerous archaeological sites in the Laeca Burn watershed, "especially on the eastern side of Laeca Burn", where Catto Long Barrow is situated.

See also
 Hill of Aldie
 Morris Wells
 Skelmuir Hill
 Tumulus

Line notes

References
 United Kingdom Ordnance Survey Map (2004) 1:50,000 scale, Landranger series 
 C. Michael Hogan (2008) C. Michael Hogan (2008) Catto Long Barrow fieldnotes, The Modern Antiquarian

Rivers of Aberdeenshire